Juliette Heuzey (after marriage, Goyau; pen names, Jules-Philippe Heuzey, J.Ph. Heuzey, Mme. Georges Goyau; 1 January 1865 – 7 July 1952) was a French writer. She was a recipient of the Montyon Prize.

Biography
Juliette Heuzey was born 1 January 1865, in Le Havre. Her parents were Jules Philippe Heuzey and Irma (Deschamps) Heuzey.

Besides popular novels, she wrote Dieu premier servi. Georges Goyau : sa vie et son, in memory of her husband, the academician Georges Goyau (1869–1939). Her books were signed under various names including, "Jules-Philippe Heuzey", "J.Ph. Heuzey", and "Mme. Georges Goyau". In 1897, she was awarded the Montyon Prize by the Académie Française for, Les actes de Diotime, de Jules-Philippe Heuzey.

Juliette Heuzey-Goyau died 7 July 1952, in Bernay, Eure. She is buried in the Père Lachaise Cemetery (section 44). Her writings are held by the Departmental archives of Yvelines (166J, Ms 4910, 1 piece, 1932).

Awards
 1897, Montyon Prize, Académie Française

Selected works 
 Les actes de Diotime, 1896
 Un monastère persécuté, au temps de Luther, les Mémoires de Charité Pirckheimer, 1905
 Leur victime, 1909
 La Normandie et ses peintres, 1909
 Le Chemin sans but, 1919
 Les Dominicole, 1928
 L'Amour qui sépare, 1932
 La Victoire d'Arlette - Collection Stella, no. 126, 1933
 Une mère qui s'évade, 1934
 Ceci a tué cela, 1936

References

1865 births
1952 deaths
19th-century French writers
20th-century French writers
19th-century French novelists
20th-century French novelists
19th-century French women writers
20th-century French women writers
19th-century pseudonymous writers
French women novelists
French biographers
Writers from Le Havre
Pseudonymous women writers